Lottery Ticket is a 2010 American comedy film directed by Erik White and starring Bow Wow, Brandon T. Jackson, Naturi Naughton, Keith David, Charlie Murphy, Gbenga Akinnagbe, Terry Crews, Mike Epps, Loretta Devine and Ice Cube. The story follows a young man from Atlanta who wins a $370 million lottery, and soon realizes that people from the neighborhood are not his real friends, but are after his money.

Released theatrically on August 20, 2010 by Warner Bros. Pictures, the film received mixed reviews from critics, who praised the cast's performances but criticized the story and characters. It was also a box office disappointment, only grossing $24.7 million worldwide against a $17 million budget.

Plot
Kevin Carson (Bow Wow) is a young man living in the projects with his grandmother (Loretta Devine). Kevin dreams of one day designing his own sneaker line, but currently works at Foot Locker.  His dreams are supported by two of his best friends: Benny (Brandon T. Jackson) and Stacey (Naturi Naughton).  He comes across Lorenzo (Gbenga Akinnagbe), the neighborhood bully. Meanwhile, everyone in his neighborhood is trying to win the Mondo Million Dollar Lottery of $370 million.

Lorenzo demands that Kevin gives him and his three friends three sets of sneakers each for free. When Lorenzo shows up to Kevin's job at Foot Locker, and grabs the shoes, the alarms go off and the police arrive, after Lorenzo claims Kevin gave him the shoes as a gift, he attempts to explain to the police that he did not intend to give the shoes to Lorenzo, Lorenzo is arrested for shoplifting and Kevin loses his job.

On his way home, he buys a Mondo Millionaire Lottery ticket at a gas station, playing his grandmother's and his lucky numbers. He meets Benny, who tells him that the whole neighborhood heard that Kevin "snitched" on Lorenzo, and is even called one by their friends. Defeated, Kevin goes home and quickly falls asleep. Later, the numbers of the lottery are announced. Grandma's ticket doesn't win, but Kevin finds out that his own ticket has won him $370 million.

However, when he and Benny head to the claims office, they are told that they must wait three days for the office to reopen, due to the Fourth of July weekend. News of Kevin's winning ticket spreads, and the entire neighborhood swarms him and his home, begging for a cut of the money. Nikki Swayze (Teairra Marí) who previously rejected Kevin, suddenly develops an interest in him.

This angers Stacey, who tells Kevin that Nikki is only after his money, but Kevin does not believe it. Kevin and Benny meet a loan shark, Sweet Tee (Keith David), who gives Kevin $100,000 to go out and have fun. After her date with Kevin, Nikki secretly tries to make him get her pregnant, but Kevin refuses. Nikki then reveals to Kevin that she was legally trying to get half of his money, by having a baby with him. He leaves the house angry and upset. Upon leaving the building, a man calls him from the basement window. Kevin meets Mr. Washington (Ice Cube), a retired boxer, who invites him to his house for a conversation.

The next day, Kevin attends church with his grandmother until Benny comes in and tells him that Lorenzo is looking for him and the ticket. Lorenzo comes in and is stopped by the churchgoers. Kevin tries to escape, but he's confronted by Lorenzo's crew. Sweet Tee's bodyguard saves Kevin with his gun, but Lorenzo emerges and physically breaks his hand. Then, Kevin runs to the train station with Lorenzo and his boys chasing him. Kevin leaps onto the train thinking he's safe, but Lorenzo gets on, too. However Kevin hops off before the doors close. The train leaves the station with Lorenzo on.

Later that day, Kevin and Benny have an argument about the ticket when Benny asks Kevin to let him keep the ticket so Lorenzo wouldn’t take it , leads to them not speaking to each other. He goes to Stacey's house, and she tells Kevin that she thinks he was wrong about the entire situation. He also tells her that she is the girl for him, which leads to her getting angry and telling him to get out. He kisses her and she responds accordingly, but they are interrupted by the arrival of her mother.

As Kevin leaves Stacie’s house, Lorenzo knocks him unconscious and takes his sneakers and ticket. The following day, he wakes up in the apartment of Mr. Washington, who talks with him. Kevin also takes time to reconcile with Benny. They make a scheme to fool Lorenzo that the ticket is fake, which later upsets Lorenzo. Later, the neighborhood has a block party and Kevin learns that Sweet Tee will torture him if he doesn't pay back the loan.

Lorenzo arrives, defeats Sweet Tee and beats Kevin to the point where he forces Kevin to give him the fake ticket through gunpoint. Just as Kevin submits, Mr. Washington appears from behind and knocks Lorenzo unconscious, being hailed a hero to the neighborhood. Afterwards, Benny tells Kevin to sign the back of the lottery ticket.

Months later, Kevin has started his sneaker company with Benny as his CEO and Stacy as his future attorney and his girlfriend. It is implied that Kevin have paid Sweet Tee back. He also opens a park with Mr. Washington appointed as head security and a foundation that will help the community by funding businesses and providing scholarships. After giving a speech to the neighborhood, Kevin, Benny and Stacey board Kevin's new helicopter and fly off to work.

Cast
 Bow Wow as Kevin Carson 
 Ice Cube as Jerome “Thump” Washington 
Brandon T. Jackson as Benny
 Naturi Naughton as Stacy
 Loretta Devine as Grandma Dorothy Carson
 Gbenga Akinnagbe as Lorenzo Mack
 Keith David as Sweet Tee
 Terry Crews as Jimmy
 Charlie Murphy as "Semaj" (James)
 Teairra Marí as Nikki Swayze
 Jason Weaver as Ray Ray
 Leslie Jones as Tasha
 Vince Green as Malik
 Malieek Straughter as Deangelo
 T-Pain as Junior
 Bill Bellamy as Giovanni Watson
 Mike Epps as Reverend Taylor
 Chris Williams as Doug
 IronE Singleton as Tucker
 Jayson Warner Smith as Charlie (Uncredited)
 Lil Twist as Lil J.

Reception

Box office 
In the United States and Canada, Lottery Ticket was released alongside Nanny McPhee and the Big Bang, Piranha 3D and The Switch, and was projected to gross under $10 million from 1,973 theaters on its opening weekend. The film made $3.8 million on its first day and went on to debut to $10.6 million, finishing fourth and coming slightly above expectations.

Critical response 
On review aggregator website Rotten Tomatoes, the film holds an approval rating of 34% based on 82 reviews, with an average rating of 5.10/10. The site's critical consensus reads, "There's a worthwhile message at the heart of Lottery Ticket, but it's buried under stale humor, tired stereotypes, and obvious clichés." On Metacritic, the film holds a weighted average score of 50 out of 100, on 24 critics, indicating "mixed or average reviews". Audiences polled by CinemaScore gave the film an average grade of "A−" on an A+ to F scale.

Soundtrack
The following is a track listing of songs for the film, Lottery Ticket. Songs marked with an '*' are just songs that can be briefly heard in the film.

Songs featured in the film
"Workin' Man Blues" - Aceyalone featuring Bionik
"Look At Me Now" - King Juju
"Lord Rescue Me" - Jason Eskridge
"If You're Really Hood" - The Handlebars
"What You Talkin About" - Classic
"How Low" - Ludacris
"I Make the Hood Look Good" - T-Drop
"Tim & Bob Groove 1" - Tim & Bob
"We Like to Party" - Ben and Family
"Mysterious Love" - Lamar J and Deshawn Williams (of Take 2)
"I Be Doin It" - Classic
"Outta Control" - Envy
"Gangsta Party" - Classic
"Southside" - Johnny Ringo
"I Can Transform Ya"*- Chris Brown
"Money (That's What I Want) - Barrett Strong
"Hallelujah"
"All Your Bass" - T-Pain
"Tim & Bob Groove 2" - Tim & Bob
"Deez Hips" - Dem Naughty Boyz
"Oh Happy Day" - Edwin Hawkins Singers
"Whoa Now" - B Rich
"Million Bucks" - Maino featuring Swizz Beatz
"Tim & Bob Groove 3" - Tim & Bob
"I Invented Sex" - Trey Songz featuring Drake
"Standing in the Rain" - Al Green
"Come By Here My Lord" - Tick Ticker
"Un-Thinkable (I'm Ready)" - Alicia Keys featuring Drake
"Let My People Go" - Darondo
"Take Your Shirt Off" - T-Pain
"Here to Party" - Classic
"For My Hood" - Bow Wow featuring Sean Kingston

See also
List of black films of the 2010s
List of hood films

References

External links 
 
 
 
 
 

2010 films
Alcon Entertainment films
2010 comedy films
Warner Bros. films
Cube Vision films
Films scored by Teddy Castellucci
African-American comedy films
African-American films
2010 directorial debut films
Films about lotteries
2010s English-language films
2010s American films